19 Entertainment is a producer of entertainment properties for television with a focus on music. Founded by Simon Fuller in London in 1985, the company co-produced Pop Idol in the United Kingdom with Thames Television in 2001. The Idol series has since become one of the most successful entertainment formats, sold to more than seventy countries around the world, including American Idol in the United States. 19 Entertainment is also responsible for the production of So You Think You Can Dance.

Background and history
Founded in London, England in 1985, 19 Entertainment was named after the Paul Hardcastle song which was one of Simon Fuller's first notable successes while working as an A&R man for Chrysalis Records. In 2001 the company co-produced Pop Idol in the United Kingdom with Thames Television. An immense success, Maggie Brown in The Guardian states, "the show became a seminal reality/entertainment format once on air that autumn".

In 2009 the company announced the purchase of London-based Storm Model Management, one of the world's top modelling agencies. This business was sold back to Storm's management in 2013, ending the firm's activities in fashion.

In March 2005, 19 Entertainment founder Simon Fuller sold the company to Robert Sillerman's CKX, Inc. in a cash and stock deal worth $210 million. Subsequent to the deal Fuller remained in his role as CEO of 19 Entertainment and added the new role of director of CKX. In his dual role Fuller was able to effectively co-ordinate all creative aspects of the CKX business until January 2010 when, as he approached the end of his employment contract with CKX, Inc., he decided to start up a new business, XIX Entertainment, while still acting as a consultant to CKX / 19 and as an Executive Producer of 19's shows. Following this, CKX announced its intention to shift 19 to becoming a US business focusing solely on  American Idol and So You Think You Can Dance brands. 19's old Headquarters in Battersea, London became the headquarters for Simon Fuller's new business, XIX, while the base for 19 Entertainment was transferred to Los Angeles. 
In September 2010 much of 19's non- American Idol business was sold to Simon Fuller's new business XIX Entertainment. This included 19's non-Idol management clients such as David and Victoria Beckham, Andy Murray, Annie Lennox, The Spice Girls, Lewis Hamilton, S Club 7, Carrie Underwood, David Cook, and others. Also transferred to XIX Entertainment were Roland Mouret and Victoria Beckham's fashion businesses.

Sillerman and partners accepted an offer from Apollo Global Management on July 21, 2011 to purchase the entire stock of CKX, Inc, and the business was re-branded as CORE Media Group  in 2012 with 19 Entertainment becoming the group's primary west coast division. In 2018 CORE Media Group purchased Eli Holzman’s Intellectual Property Corporation with Holzman and fellow IPC founder Aaron Saidman leading the enlarged group, rebranded from CORE Media to Industrial Media Inc. In March 2022 Sony Pictures Television purchased Industrial Media for $350m, with Industrial becoming Sony Pictures Television’s nonfiction division continuing to be led by Holtzman and Saidman and with a remit to expand the group.

19 Television series

Current series
 American Idol (2002–2016, 2018–present)
 So You Think You Can Dance (2005–present)

Former series
 Miami 7 (1999)
 L.A. 7 (2000)
 S Club 7 Go Wild! (2000)
 S Club Search (2001)
 Hollywood 7 (2001)
 Viva S Club (2002)
 American Juniors (2003)
 All American Girl (2003)
 I Dream (2004)
 Giving You Everything (2007)
 Little Britain USA (2008)
 If I Can Dream (2010)

19 Entertainment films
 Spice World (co-production with Icon Productions and Columbia Pictures) (1997)
 Seeing Double (co-production with Columbia Pictures) (2003)
 From Justin to Kelly (co-production with 20th Century Fox) (2003)

S Club 7 - TV films
 Back to the '50s (1999)
 Boyfriends & Birthdays (1999)
 Artistic Differences (2000)
 Christmas Special (2000)

19 Recordings artist roster

See also 
 American Idol
 CKX, Inc.
 Simon Fuller

References

External links

Television production companies of the United Kingdom
Mass media companies established in 1985
Music companies of the United Kingdom
Former News Corporation subsidiaries
Former subsidiaries of The Walt Disney Company